The Last Warrior: Root of Evil (also known as The Last Warrior 2) is a 2021 Russian fantasy comedy film, a sequel to the 2017's The Last Warrior (The Last Knight).
The film is directed by Dmitry Dyachenko, and produced by The Walt Disney Company CIS, The Walt Disney Company's subsidiary in Russia, in collaboration with the Russian production company Yellow, Black and White.

A new story about the meeting of two worlds - modern Moscow, Russia and the fabulous Belogorie, Ancient Rus'. The Rus' people where the heroes of Russian fairy tales, epics and legends live. Ivan Naydenov, having tried on the role of Bogatyr, discovers the origins of the ancient evil that threatens Belogorie and participates in an epic battle shoulder to shoulder with folk heroes.

The film stars Viktor Khorinyak, Mila Sivatskaya, Ekaterina Vilkova, Elena Yakovleva, Konstantin Lavronenko, Sergey Burunov, Yelena Valyushkina, and Kirill Zaytsev, the voices of Garik Kharlamov as the fairy tale Kolobok.
Principal photography began in June 2019, the film crew moved between the Moscow Oblast, Republic of Karelia, the Perm Krai, and again the North Caucasus, where mountain panoramas and relic forests were found near Sochi, in the Sochi National Park.

The film was theatrically released in the Russian Federation by Walt Disney Studios Motion Pictures International on January 1, 2021.

A sequel, The Last Warrior 3, was released in December 2021.

Plot 
In the second part, viewers will learn about the origins of the ancient evil that the heroes had to face in the first film, see new corners of the fabulous Belogorie and witness exciting battles with the participation of epic Bogatyrs.

Cast 
 Viktor Khorinyak as Ivan Ilyich Naydenov / Ivan Ilyich Muromets
 Mila Sivatskaya as Vasilisa the Wise
 Ekaterina Vilkova as Princess Varvara
 Marta Timofeeva as Young Varvara
 Elena Yakovleva as Baba Yaga, a witch doctor and sorceress
 Konstantin Lavronenko as Koschei
 Sergey Burunov as Vodyanoy, a merman
 Yelena Valyushkina as Galina, Princess Varvara’s mother, and the wife of Ilya Muromets
 Kirill Zaytsev as Finist the Falcon, the bogatyr is a warrior
 Timofey Tribuntsev as the white mage Svetozar, a starets

 Garik Kharlamov as Kolobok, (voice)
 Aleksandr Semchev as Chudo-Yudo, a monster
 Yuriy Tsurilo as Ilya Muromets, the bogatyr is a warrior
 Vladislav Vetrov as Belogor / Rogoleb, (voice)
 Andrey Trushin as a visiting bogatyr is a warrior

Production

Development
The writers of the film The Last Warrior: Root of Evil continued to follow the canon begun in the first film: they did not only invite evil spirits (Koschei, Baba Yaga, Vodyanoy) to their fairy tale, but also added new magical assistants - and above all, a stunning, dashing Kolobok.

Marina Zhigalova-Ozkan, Disney Studios in Russia and the CIS, added.

Filming
Principal photography of the film was shot on Krestovaya Hill near the city of Gubakha in the Urals, Krasnodar Krai and Republic of Karelia, and the main, where the whole city was, took place in the Moscow Oblast suburbs, where a special city was constructed for the film.

Filming began in June 2020. In the photographs from the set, various decorations were seen: huts, ice warriors. At the same time, it is known that the events of the film will take place both in winter and in summer.

Release
The film is scheduled to release on December 24, 2020 in the United States and in Russia, it was released on January 1, 2021.

Marketing
On December 5, 2019, the first teaser trailer for the film was posted on the Odnoklassniki website.

Reception

Box office
In the first week of distribution, the film grossed a whole billion rubles at the box office, and according to preliminary forecasts of Igromania magazine, the film has a chance to bypass the fees of the previous part and collect two billion rubles for the entire rental period. By the end of January 2021, the film was able to overcome the bar of two billion rubles, which is twenty-six and a half million dollars.

Sequels
Filming for a sequel known as The Last Warrior: A Messenger of Darkness was held in the suburbs of Moscow and in the town of Barvikha. Filming for the film took place in the fall of 2019 and the film is scheduled for release in 2022. The film is directed by Dmitriy Dyachenko (director of previous films) produced by Eduard Iloyan, Marina Zhigalova-Ozkan and Vitaliy Shlyappo, according to a script written by Dimitriy Yan and Pavel Danilov, starring Viktor Khorinyak.

See also
 The Last Warrior (2017 film)
 The Last Warrior: A Messenger of Darkness (2021 film)

References

External links 
 

2021 films
2020s Russian-language films
2020s fantasy comedy films
2020s fantasy action films
2020s children's fantasy films
2020s fantasy adventure films
Russian sequel films
Walt Disney Pictures films
Films based on fairy tales
Films based on Russian folklore
Films based on Slavic mythology
Films scored by George Kallis
Russian fantasy comedy films
Russian fantasy adventure films
Russian action adventure films
Russian children's fantasy films
2020s adventure comedy films
Russian adventure comedy films
2020s fantasy thriller films
Russian fantasy thriller films
Magic realism films
Films set in forests
Science fantasy films
Films set in Moscow
Films set in Russia
Comedy crossover films
2020s children's comedy films
2021 action adventure films
Films shot in Moscow Oblast
Films shot in the North Caucasus
Films shot in Sochi
Films shot in Russia
2021 fantasy films
2021 comedy films
Fantasy crossover films